Sinisa Markovic (born 22 August 1988) is an Austrian football player. He plays for SV Wallern.

Club career
He made his Austrian Football First League debut for FC Blau-Weiß Linz on 22 July 2016 in a game against WSG Wattens.

References

External links
 

1988 births
Living people
Austrian footballers
LASK players
FC Blau-Weiß Linz players
SV Wallern players
2. Liga (Austria) players
Austrian Regionalliga players
Association football midfielders